Vladimír Franz (born May 25, 1959 in Prague, Czechoslovakia), is a Czech composer, painter, university scholar and occasional journalist, poet and playwright. Since mid-1980s he has composed stage music for more than 150 theatre performances—for many of them he was awarded national-level prizes—he has also composed a symphony, several operas, oratorios, a musical, ballet, as well as film music and music for documentaries and radio plays. His second main area of activities in the field of arts is represented by painting. Since 1991 he has been a lecturer at the Prague's Faculty of Theatre. In 2012 he was also a registered candidate in the 2013 Czech presidential election. The attention of local as well as world media has been attracted to him usually due to his extraordinarily extensive tattoo.

Biography 
Franz was born in Prague. He studied at a gymnasium and later at the Faculty of Law of Charles University (1978–1982). During his studies, he took private lectures in painting, composition, art history and music history.

After his studies, he did not enter legal practice, but instead spent the 1980s in a variety of jobs, including as a high school teacher. In 1981, he co-founded the theatre Kytka, and gradually moved his attention to scenic music.

Since 1991, he has worked as a teacher at the Faculty of Theatre of the Academy of Performing Arts in Prague. In 2004, he was appointed Professor of Dramatic Arts.

In 2013 he was a candidate in the Czech presidential elections. He placed 5th in the first round with 6.84% (351,916 votes), but did not qualify for the second round.

Tattoos 
Vladimír Franz is known also for his extensive tattoos, including facial ones. His unusual appearance attracted the attention of world press during the 2013 presidential election.

In an interview for the TV NOVA, he commented:

Awards 
Franz is a six-time recipient of the Alfréd Radok Award:
 1998 – scenic music to the play Bloudění (Jaroslav Durych), directed by J. A. Pitínský, National Theatre, Prague
 2000 – scenic music to the play Hamlet (William Shakespeare), directed by Vladimír Morávek, Klicperovo divadlo, Hradec Králové
 2002 – scenic music to the play Marketa Lazarová (Vladislav Vančura), directed by J. A. Pitínský, National Theatre, Prague
 2005 – scenic music to the play Devotion to the Cross (Pedro Calderón de la Barca), directed by Hana Burešová, Brno City Theatre
 2006 – scenic music to the play Amphitryon (Molière), directed by Hana Burešová, Brno City Theatre
 2007 – scenic music to the play Smrt Pavla I., Brno City Theatre

Published works 

 Kamenný most – 1997
 Faust –  1998
 Cirkus Humberto –  1998
 Júdit Tractatus Pacis – 1999
 Vladimír Franz pro Národní divadlo – 1999
 Gazdina roba –  2000
 Rút –  2001
 Kruhy do ledu –  2002
 Ha-Hamlet !!! (Shakespearovská svita) – 2005
 Triptych: Smrt Pavla I, Amfitryon, Znamení kříže  –  2007

See also
 List of Czech painters

References

External links

 
 Vladimír Franz's Presidential Campaign Website

1959 births
20th-century classical composers
21st-century classical composers
Czech classical composers
Czech male classical composers
Czech painters
Czech male painters
Czech politicians
People known for being heavily tattooed
Living people
Musicians from Prague
Charles University alumni
Candidates in the 2013 Czech presidential election